Danilov (masculine) or Danilova (feminine) is a common Russian last name. Notable people with the surname include:
Alexander Danilov, fled Russia during the revolution, immigrated to Belgium
Alexandra Danilova (1903–1997) Russian-born prima ballerina, who became an American citizen
Angelina Danilova (born 1996), Russian singer, model and actress
Elena Danilova (born 1987), Russian international association football player
Galina Danilova (born 1968), Russian actress
Irina Danilova (born 1993), Kazakhstani handball player
Kirsha Danilov, probable compiler of first collection of Russian bylinas
Maria Danilova (1793–1810), Russian ballet dancer
Nichita Danilov (b. 1952), Romanian writer
Oleksiy Danilov (born 1962), Ukrainian politician
Olga Danilova (born 1970), Russian Olympic cross country skier
Olga Danilov (born 1973), Ukrainian-Israeli short track speed skater
Pelageya Danilova (1918–2001), Russian artistic gymnast
Sergei Danilov (b. 1989), Russian association football player
Tamara Danilova (born 1939), Russian Olympic discus thrower
Valentin Danilov (b. 1951), physicist
Vasily Danilov (disambiguation), list of people
Viktor Danilov (1927–2016), Russian-born Belarusian Greek Catholic priest and Soviet dissident.
Vitaliy Danilov (b. 1967), president of Ukrainian Premier League and Honorary President of FC Kharkiv
Yuri Danilov (1866–1937), Russian military figure and historian

Russian-language surnames
Patronymic surnames
Surnames from given names